Dillon Fournier (born June 15, 1994) is a Canadian retired ice hockey defenceman. He formerly played for the Indy Fuel in the ECHL as a prospect for the Chicago Blackhawks of the National Hockey League (NHL). Fournier was selected by the Chicago Blackhawks in the 2nd round (48th overall) of the 2012 NHL Entry Draft.

Playing career
Fournier was picked first overall by the Lewiston Maineiacs in the 2010 QMJHL Entry Draft, and competed with Team Quebec at the 2011 World U-17 Hockey Challenge. After one season he was selected first overall by the Rouyn-Noranda Huskies in the QMJHL dispersal draft after the Lewiston Maineiacs  folded. He was recognized for his outstanding play when he was chosen for the 2012 CHL Top Prospects Game.

On March 10, 2014, the Chicago Blackhawks of the National Hockey League signed Fournier to a three-year entry-level contract.

On June 8, 2017, Fournier retired from professional hockey due to a chronic shoulder injury that limited him to only 13 games between the AHL and ECHL over the past two years.

Awards and honours

References

External links

1994 births
Living people
Canadian ice hockey defencemen
Chicago Blackhawks draft picks
Ice hockey people from Quebec
Indy Fuel players
Lewiston Maineiacs players
People from Dorval
Rockford IceHogs (AHL) players
Rouyn-Noranda Huskies players